Albania competed at the 2015 European Games, in Baku, Azerbaijan from 12 to 28 June 2015.

Team

Boxing

Men

Cycling

Road
Men

Judo

Men

Karate

Shooting 

Men

Swimming 

Men 

Women

Taekwondo

Wrestling

Men's freestyle

References

Nations at the 2015 European Games
European Games
2015